Les Charbonnières is a part of Le Lieu, a commune located in the La Vallée district of the canton of Vaud, Switzerland.

Villages in the canton of Vaud